Rex F. Rice (born May 9, 1957) is an American politician. He is a member of the South Carolina Senate from the 2nd District, serving since 2016. Rice previously served as a member of the South Carolina House of Representatives from 1994 to 2010. He is a member of the Republican Party.

References

Living people
1957 births
Republican Party South Carolina state senators
21st-century American politicians
People from Pensacola, Florida